Hippiscus is a genus of band-winged grasshoppers in the family Acrididae. There is only one described species in the genus, Hippiscus ocelote from North America.

References

Further reading

External links
 

Oedipodinae
Articles created by Qbugbot
Monotypic Orthoptera genera